Ecumenopolis (from  oecumene 'world', and  polis 'city', thus 'a world city'; plural ecumenopolises or ecumenopoleis) is the hypothetical concept of a planetwide city.

Description
The word was invented in 1967 by the Greek city planner Constantinos Apostolou Doxiadis to represent the idea that, in the future, urban areas and megalopolises would eventually fuse, and there would be a single continuous worldwide city as a progression from the current urbanization, population growth, transport and human networks. According to Doxiadis, it was the fifteenth level of ekistic units and the most significant one as the uppermost echelon of the classification. The term "Ecumenopolis" comes from two Greek words, "oikoumenē" which means "inhabited world," and "polis," which means "city." This concept was already current in science fiction in 1942, with Trantor in Isaac Asimov's Foundation series. When made public, Doxiadis' idea of ecumenopolis seemed "close to science fiction", but today is "surprisingly pertinent" according to geography researchers Pavle Stamenovic, Dunja Predic and Davor Eres, especially as a consequence of globalization and Europeanization.

Doxiadis also created a scenario based on the traditions and trends of urban development of his time, predicting at first a European eperopolis ("continent city") which would be based on the area between London, Paris, Rhine-Ruhr and Amsterdam. In 2008, Time magazine coined Nylonkong to link New York City, London, and Hong Kong as the eperopolis of the Americas, Euro-Africa and Asia-Pacific.

In popular culture
Before the term had been created, the concept had been previously discussed. The American religious leader Thomas Lake Harris (1823–1906) mentioned city-planets in his verses, and science fiction author Isaac Asimov used the city-planet Trantor as the setting of some of his Foundation novels.

In science fiction, the ecumenopolis has become a frequent topic and popularized in 1999 by the fictional city planet Coruscant in the Star Wars franchise, which is the capital of the Galactic Republic (later Empire) and home to the Jedi Order. In addition to Coruscant, the Star Wars Expanded Universe also features Nar Shaddaa, a moon ecumenopolis known for being almost entirely ruled by crime lords, and Taris, a former ecumenopolis that was destroyed and became a ruined swamp.

In Dune, the Harkonens' home world of Giedi Prime is a heavily polluted ecumenopolis infamous for its gladiator arenas.

The concept has been explored in the video game Stellaris, where players are given the option of transforming a planet into an ecumenopolis, which provides a great deal of housing and space for industrial production at the cost of making the planet's natural resources inaccessible.

A central setting in the tabletop wargame Warhammer 40,000 is a portrayal of Earth in the far future, where it is known as "Holy Terra" and is described as having been transformed into a vast, Gothic-style ecumenopolis sometime during the 30th millennium AD after its establishment as the "Throneworld", or capital, of an interstellar superpower known as the Imperium of Man.

In Invader Zim, the Irkans' home world of Irk is an ecumenopolis.

In Magic: the Gathering, the plane of Ravnica is an ecumenopolis.

DC Comics continuity features Darkseid's extra-dimensional home planet of Apokolips, often depicted as a hellish world covered entirely in industrial sprawl to feed Darkseid's brutal empire.

In Loonatics Unleashed, the planet Acmetropolis was classified as a city planet in the season one intro.

The video game Star Citizen features an ecumenopolis in the Stanton system called "ArcCorp", owned by a fictional in-game company of the same name that is headquartered on the planet. The main location players can land and explore is known as "Area18".

The manga and film of Blame! by Tsutomu Nihei is set in a far future in which Earth has become the ruins of planet-covering city, which is suggested to be so large that it has consumed most of the Solar System as well. Some of his other works also take place in this same setting.

See also

 Arcology
 Conurbation
 Ecumene
 Ekistics
 Megacity
 Megalopolis
 Megastructure
 Merger (politics)
 Metropolis
 Principles of intelligent urbanism
 Urban Sprawl
 World government

References

External links

 

 
Urban studies and planning terminology
Human habitats
City